Al-Khunayzir, was a Palestinian Arab village in the District of Baysan. It was depopulated during the 1948 Arab-Israeli War on May 20, 1948.

History
In 1881, a nearby tell was named as Tell el Khaneizîr, meaning the mound of the swine, and a nearby spring was named as Ain el Khaneizîr meaning the spring of the swine. خنزير means pig in Arabic.

British Mandate era
In  the 1922 census of Palestine, conducted by the  Mandatory Palestine authorities,  Kunaizir had a population of 83; all Muslims, increasing in the  1931 census   to 200 Muslims, in a total of 47 houses.

In the   1945 statistics the population was 260 Muslims, with a total of 3,107 dunams of land.  Of this, 36 dunams were for citrus and bananas, 1,658 for plantations and irrigated land, 256  for cereals, while 34 dunams  were non-cultivable land.

1948, and aftermath
In 1992 it was described: "The only remaining landmarks is a  cemetery on Tall Abu al-Faraj (199/203), north of the site. To the north and the west of this tell are the springs of 'Uyun Umm al-Faraj and 'Ayn al-Khanazir. Most of the village site and the land around it are covered with palm trees."

References

Bibliography

External links
 Welcome To al-Khunayzir
 al-Khunayzir,  Zochrot
Survey of Western Palestine, Map 9:     IAA, Wikimedia commons

Arab villages depopulated during the 1948 Arab–Israeli War